Kim Felton (born 27 March 1975) is an Australian professional golfer.

As an amateur, Felton won the Australian Amateur in 1997 and was the low individual in the 1998 Eisenhower Trophy.

Felton turned professional in 1999 and played mainly on the PGA Tour of Australasia and its developmental Tour, the Von Nida Tour. He won five events on the Von Nida Tour as well as three other Australian events. Felton also played on the Nationwide Tour from 2005 to 2008 where he won the 2005 Knoxville Open. In 2010, he won the Midea China Classic on the OneAsia Tour.

Amateur wins
1997 Australian Amateur

Professional wins (14)

PGA Tour of Australasia wins (1)

PGA Tour of Australasia playoff record (1–0)

Nationwide Tour wins (1)

OneAsia Tour wins (1)

Von Nida Tour wins (5)

Australasian Development Tour wins (1)

Other wins (5)
2003 Western Australia Open (incorporating the Nedlands Masters)
2006 Western Australia Open (incorporating the Nedlands Masters)
2010 Cottesloe Open
2011 Spalding Park Open
2012 Broome Funishings Open

Results in major championships

Note: Felton only played in The Open Championship.
"T" = tied

Team appearances
Amateur
Eisenhower Trophy: 1998 (individual leader)

References

External links

Australian male golfers
PGA Tour of Australasia golfers
PGA Tour golfers
Golfers from Perth, Western Australia
Sportsmen from Western Australia
1975 births
Living people